Chelsea Kane Staub (born September 15, 1988) is an American actress and singer. She is known for her role as Stella Malone in the Disney Channel sitcom television series Jonas and the role of Riley Perrin in the Freeform sitcom, Baby Daddy. She also voiced Bea Goldfishberg in the Disney Channel animated sitcom Fish Hooks.

Early life
Chelsea Kane Staub was born in Phoenix, Arizona on September 15, 1988. Kane is the only child of John and Becky Staub. She worked at Valley Youth Theatre.

Career
Kane made her professional acting debut in the 2001 short film entitled Failure of Pamela Salt. She went on to guest star in the television series Cracking Up, Listen Up!, the pilot episode of Summerland and the 2004 direct-to-video film Arizona Summer.

In 2007, Kane starred in her first theatrical film role as Meredith Baxter Dimly, in the film Bratz, playing the film's antagonist. She also performed two of the songs on the film's soundtrack.

In 2008, she starred in Minutemen as Stephanie Jameson. She also appeared in one episode of Wizards of Waverly Place (the episode, "The Supernatural") and she starred in the Disney Channel original film Starstruck (2010). She played the role of Stella Malone, the stylist and long time best friend of the band J.O.N.A.S., in the Disney Channel series Jonas The series aired from 2009 to 2010. From 2010 to 2014, Kane co-starred in the Disney Channel animated series Fish Hooks voicing the role of Bea Goldfishberg.

In 2010, Kane filmed a web series called "The Homes" written and directed by John Cabrera. The series premiered on January 27, 2011, on Lockerz.com. Kane was one of the celebrity contestants in season 12 on the American ballroom competition Dancing with the Stars. Her professional partner was Mark Ballas, a two-time champion of the series. She made it to the season finale, but finished in third place behind Hines Ward and Kirstie Alley.

In 2011, Kane joined the cast of the final season of The CW's One Tree Hill in a recurring role. She played a character named Tara, who is a love interest for Kane's real life ex-boyfriend Stephen Colletti's character, Chase. From 2012 to 2017, Kane co-starred as Riley Perrin in the Freeform sitcom Baby Daddy.

Filmography

Film

Television

Music videos

Discography

Awards and nominations

Dancing with the Stars performances
Chelsea Kane's partner was Mark Ballas.

In week 7, Donnie Burns was the guest judge and scored the dances.
On the finale, Chelsea Kane received third place despite tying for the top of the leaderboard, topping the leaderboard for 6 other dances throughout the season, and having the second highest average in the season.

References

External links

 
 

1988 births
21st-century American actresses
Actresses from Phoenix, Arizona
American child actresses
American child singers
American television actresses
American voice actresses
Participants in American reality television series
Living people
21st-century American singers
21st-century American women singers